Marco Antonio Franciotti (1592 – 8 February 1666) was an Italian Catholic Cardinal and Bishop of Lucca.

Early life

Franciotti was born in 1592 in Lucca, Tuscany, the son of Curzio Franciotti.

He was educated at the University of Bologna where he studied law. Thereafter, he went to Rome and became a papal prelate and was employed by Giambattista Spada. He was appointed Protonotary apostolic participantium in 1619. In 1622, Franciotti was made Governor of Faenza and then Fabriano and general auditor of the Apostolic Chamber the following year. He was promoted to cleric of the Apostolic Chamber in 1626 and was named Prefect of the Annona in 1627 (a honorific title maintained by the church in the same vein as that of Praefectus annonae in Ancient Rome). He was promoted again to Auditor General of the Apostolic Chamber and held the position for 8 years; between 1629 and 1637.

Cardinalate

Franciotti was actually elevated to cardinal by Pope Urban VIII in November 1633 but the elevation was reserved in pectore tacite and was only published in the consistory of 30 March 1637 when Franciotti was appointed Bishop of Lucca; his home city. Franciotti was consecrated a month later, on 19 April 1637 at the Quirinale Palace by Antonio Marcello Barberini, Cardinal-Priest of Sant'Onofrio, with Faustus Poli, Titular Archbishop of Amasea, and Antonio Severoli, Archbishop of Dubrovnik, serving as co-consecrators.

Conflict in Lucca

Contemporary, John Bargrave, provided further insight into Franciotti's activities as Cardinal-Bishop of Lucca and those of his brother, one of the governors of Lucca. According to Bargrave, Franciotti's brother had taken up arms against the other princes of Lucca; being armed inside city walls was expressly forbidden by city law. City officials searched the houses of those suspected of being involved and found large numbers of weapons and were, at the same time, made aware of plots against the city government led by Franciotti's brother. Franciotti's brother and a number of others were arrested and prosecuted.

With his brother sentenced to death, Franciotti rushed to Rome and sought an audience with Pope Urban. Rather than give a proper account of the events leading to his brother's arrest, Franciotti told the Pope that city officials had taken issue with his conduct as Bishop and that the armed men had been employed for the protection of his own episcopal residence. Pope Urban believed his Cardinal and sent letters to Lucca demanding that Franciotti's brother be released. The city refused and the Pope excommunicated those he believed responsible for the slight and ordered that all the churches in the city be closed. City officials wrote numerous letters to church and secular officials alike but were not given permission to reopen their churches until they had come to a resolution with Cardinal Franciotti.

It is unclear if Franciotti's brother was ever executed but Franciotti resigned as Bishop of Lucca in 1645.

Later life and death

Franciotti participated in the conclave of 1644 which elected Pope Innocent X. He was appointed  Camerlengo of the Sacred College of Cardinals between 1650 and 1651 and participated in the conclave of 1655 which elected Pope Alexander VII.

Franciotti died on 8 February 1666 in Rome.

Episcopal succession

See also
Catholic Church in Italy

References

1592 births
1666 deaths
17th-century Italian cardinals
Cardinals created by Pope Urban VIII
17th-century Italian Roman Catholic bishops
Religious leaders from Lucca